Don or Donald Featherstone may refer to:

 Don Featherstone (artist) (1936–2015), creator of the pink flamingo lawn ornament
 Don Featherstone (filmmaker), professional documentary filmmaker
 Don Featherstone (filmmaker, 1902–1984), amateur filmmaker
 Donald Featherstone (wargamer) (1918–2013), British author of books on wargaming and military history